A.U.S.A. is an American sitcom television series created by Richard Appel, that aired on NBC from February 4 to April 1, 2003, starring Scott Foley.

Plot
Adam Sullivan (Scott Foley) is a naive and well-intentioned federal prosecutor (an Assistant United States Attorney) in New York City, who must contend with the difficulties of both his work life and his romantic life. While being part of the Department of Justice, Sullivan finds both colleagues and opponents challenging his every move.

Cast
 Scott Foley as Adam Sullivan
 Amanda Detmer as Susan Rakoff 
 Eddie McClintock as Owen Harper
 Ana Ortiz as Ana Rivera
 Peter Jacobson as Geoffrey Laurence
 John Ross Bowie as Wally Berman

Episodes

Reception
The show debuted on February 4, 2003, with an audience of 11.5 million viewers, ranking at #42 for the week.

References

External links
 

2003 American television series debuts
2003 American television series endings
2000s American sitcoms
2000s American legal television series
2000s American workplace comedy television series
English-language television shows
NBC original programming
Television series by 20th Century Fox Television
Television series by Universal Television
Television shows set in New York City